Alcalá is a town and  municipality located in the Department of Valle del Cauca, Colombia.

External links
 Government of Valle del Cauca: Alcala 

Municipalities of Valle del Cauca Department